CHEMKIN is a proprietary software tool for solving complex chemical kinetics problems.  It is used worldwide in the combustion, chemical processing, microelectronics and automotive industries, and also in atmospheric science.  It was originally developed at Sandia National Laboratories and is now developed by a US company, Reaction Design.

CHEMKIN solves thousands of reaction combinations to develop a comprehensive understanding of a particular process, which might involve multiple chemical species, concentration ranges, and gas temperatures.

Chemical kinetics simulation software allows for a more time-efficient investigation of a potential new process compared to direct laboratory investigation.

One important driver for the development and use of CHEMKIN is the reduction of pollutants, such as NOx.  As these pollutants become more tightly regulated through agreements by agencies such as the United States Environmental Protection Agency and the California Air Resource Board (CARB), researchers are making increasing use of simulation technology.

One limitation of CHEMKIN is that it assumes the reaction vessel has a relatively simple geometry, whereas sometimes this is not the case.  For that reason, a related program called KINetics is often used in conjunction with Computational Fluid Dynamics tools.  CFD programs are better able to account for geometric complexity, at the expense of being more limited in their treatment of the underlying chemistry of the reactive process being studied.

Reaction Design was acquired by ANSYS in 2014 so Chemkin and related products are now available through ANSYS.

See also
 Autochem
 Chemical kinetics
 Cantera
 Chemical WorkBench
 Kinetic PreProcessor (KPP)
 SpeedCHEM

External links
 CHEMKIN web page
 Sandia National Laboratory CHEMKIN Homepage,

References 

Combustion
Computational chemistry software